Joyann Geraldine Thomas (born 9 November 1998) is a football player from Pakistan. She plays as a defender for the national team as well as for her club, Balochistan United. She is the first female Christian to play football for Pakistan.

Early life and education
Thomas was born to Joyce Christina, who was a national gold medallist in the 1500 m event. Thomas is a Roman Catholic and completed her schooling from St. Joseph's Convent School in Karachi.

Career
Thomas started her youth career from Laurentian Football Club located in Garden East neighbourhood of Karachi. There, she trained under coach Khayyam Juma. She represents Balochistan United at domestic level.

National team 
Thomas made her debut in the 3rd SAFF Women's Championship held in Islamabad in November 2014, where she played in all three of Pakistan's games.

Honours
National Women Football Championship: 2014

References

1998 births
Footballers from Karachi
Pakistani women's footballers
Pakistan women's international footballers
Living people
Balochistan United W.F.C. players
Pakistani Roman Catholics
Women's association football defenders
St Joseph's Convent School, Karachi alumni